Rüedi is a surname. Notable people with the surname include: 

Andreas Rüedi (1931–2008), Swiss skier
Beat Rüedi (1920–2009), Swiss ice hockey player
Carl Rüedi (1848–1901), Swiss pulmonologist
Lisa Rüedi (born 2000), Swiss ice hockey player
Lucius Rüedi (died 1870), Swiss pulmonologist
Luzius Rüedi (1900–1993), Swiss ice hockey player
Marcel Rüedi (1938-1986), Swiss mountaineer 
Yves Rüedi (born 1976), Swiss judge